also known as Kame-jiro was a castle structure in Ebino, Miyazaki, Japan. Iino Castle was built by the Kusakabe clan and was later controlled by the Shimazu clan.

Shimazu Yoshihiro became command of the castle and spent 26 years in the castle. He set out for Battle of Kizaki from the castle.

In 1590, Yoshihiro moved to Kurino Castle in Aira. The castle was demolished by Tokugawa shogunate's one country one castle rule in 1615.

The castle is now only ruins, with some earthworks and moats. About 50 minutes walk from Ebino Iino Station.

Gallery

References

Castles in Miyazaki Prefecture
Former castles in Japan
Ruined castles in Japan
Shimazu clan
11th-century establishments in Japan